The 2013–14 season was Shrewsbury's second consecutive season back in League One after achieving a 16th-placed finish the previous season. Veteran manager Graham Turner resigned following six consecutive home defeats in January 2014, and was replaced by former player and coach Michael Jackson who could not prevent subsequent relegation to League Two.

The club also participated in the League Cup, the Football League Trophy, and the FA Cup, exiting each competition at the first-round stage.

Season review

League Cup 

Shrewsbury Town were knocked out of the League Cup in the first round by Bolton Wanderers who won 3–1 at New Meadow on 6 August 2013.

League Trophy 

Shrewsbury Town were knocked out of the League Trophy in the first round by Oldham Athletic who won 1–4 at New Meadow on 3 September 2013.

FA Cup 

Shrewsbury Town were knocked out of the FA Cup in the first round by Walsall who won 3–0 at the Bescot Stadium on 9 November 2013.

Transfers

In

Loans In

Out

Loans Out

Competitions

Pre-Season

League One

League table

League Cup

League Trophy

FA Cup

Squad statistics

Appearances and goals 

Updated 3 May 2014

|-
|colspan="14"|Players away from the club on loan:
|-
|colspan="14"|Players who appeared for Shrewsbury who left the club before the end of the season:

|}

Top scorers 

Updated 3 May 2014
* indicates player left club before end of season

Assists 

Updated 3 May 2014
* indicates player left club before end of season
Referenced from Shrewsbury Town match highlights and match reports.

Disciplinary record 

Updated 3 May 2014
* indicates player left club before end of season

International Call-ups

Updated 27 April 2014
* indicates player left club before end of season

References

External links 
 Shrewsbury Town on Soccerbase
 Shrewsbury Town Official Website
 Shrewsbury Town on BBC Sport

2013-14
2013–14 Football League One by team